The following is a list of Oricon number-one singles of 1995.

Oricon Weekly Singles Chart

References 

1995 in Japanese music
Japan Oricon
Oricon 1995